N. neglecta may refer to:
 Notelaea neglecta, P.S.Green, a plant species in the genus Notelaea found in Australia
 Notothenia neglecta, Nybelin, 1951, the yellowbelly rockcod, a fish species in the genus Notothenia

Synonyms
 Nepenthes neglecta, a synonym for Nepenthes × sharifah-hapsahii, a plant natural hybrid between N. gracilis and N. mirabilis
 Noctua neglecta, a synonym for Xestia castanea, a moth species

See also
 Neglecta (disambiguation)